Emre Aydın (born 2 February 1981) is a Turkish rock singer-songwriter. The singer won the MTV Europe Music Awards 2008 in the "Europe's Favourite Act" category. He is also the former lead singer for the Turkish rock band 6. Cadde.

Biography
Emre Aydın was born in Isparta on 2 February 1981 as the first child of Şaban and Nermin Aydın, who are both pharmacists. He has a younger brother named Yiğit. In his early years, the family moved to Antalya. Emre began playing saz at an early age and later opted for guitar. He graduated from Antalya Anadolu Lisesi (high school) and then studied economics at Dokuz Eylül University in İzmir, upon his parents' wish. In a 2009 interview Emre admitted that he never attended a musical conservatory, because he did not want to have his musical experience transformed into school lessons and exam sessions, which he thought would make him lose interest in music.

In 2016, the singer married his long time girlfriend, Eda Köksal, who is an interior architect.

Career

Sing Your Song competition
In 2002, while at Dokuz Eylül University, Emre saw the advertisement of a musical competition, Sing Your Song, aired by a domestic television channel, Show TV. The jury included well-known Turkish rock singer Koray Candemir. With a friend, Onur Ela, they decided to apply with Emre's own song, Dönersen (If you come back), and out of 1500 applicants, they won the competition. The song was selected by Universal Music into a selection album and their band, named 6. Cadde was offered a contract with Universal Music Turkey.

6. Cadde

6. Cadde (previously named EQ) was established in İzmir in 1999, by Emre Aydin and fellow students from the same university and published demo recordings for two songs, Rüyamdaki Aptal Kadın (Foolish Woman in my Dream) and Tesadüfen (By Chance) on the internet. The group went through major transforming during the years, with changing band members, the final set-up with Onur Ela applied for the musical competition Sing Your Song, which they won. This made them possible to record their first professional album, produced by Haluk Kurosman and published by Universal Music Turkey in 2003. The recording was done in Istanbul in a month's time, while all-round production of the album took  months. The first single from the album was Sabuha, previously sung by such arabesk performers as Ibrahim Tatlises. Sabuha came to life by one of the tasks the jury of Sing Your Song assigned to the participants, namely that each band had to cover a song outside of their own musical genre. The song was refurbished by 6. Cadde from a different musical approach, changing its style and arrangements, in less than 15 minutes, as they had forgotten about the task and hurriedly recorded Sabuha for next day's competition shooting. Later the song was re-recorded for the album. In an interview Kurosman gave away that the 6. Cadde album was the rough mix of studio recordings, previously prepared for radio promotion, because his computer's hard disk became damaged, all the records vanished, and they did not have time to record them all over again. Soon after the first stocks arrived to the shops, Universal Music Turkey closed down, Onur Ela decided to leave the band, and Emre opted for a solo career.

Solo career

After 6. Cadde broke up, Emre returned to Izmir, where he went through a difficult phase of his life. He had difficulties at the university, in finding a new rent, and other personal problems that made him write most of the songs of his first solo album, "Afili Yalnızlık" (Ostentatious Loneliness), released by Sony BMG in 2006, after he was signed by former 6. Cadde producer Haluk Kurosman and talent manager Hadi Elazzi's own company, GRGDN. The album was recorded in the GRGDN studio in the Ulus district of Istanbul. Emre was assisted by renowned Turkish musicians, bass guitar was played by Cem Bahtiyar of maNga, drums by İllker Baliç of Gripin, electric guitar by Tuğrul Akyüz of Vega and Kurosman himself also contributed as a musician. His first videoclip was shot for the title song, "Afili Yalnızlık", directed by cinematographer Yon Thomas, who has previously worked with, among others, Norah Jones and Slipknot. The storyline was also written by Thomas, who excluded the singer from the scenario of a narcissistic woman, played by Turkish actress Şebnem Dönmez. The story of the first video was extended to the following two videos, shot for "Kim Dokunduysa Sana" (Whoever Touched You) and "Git" (Go), the latter was also directed by Yon Thomas. Three more videos were shot, for "Belki Bir Gün Özlersin" (Maybe One Day You'll Miss), "Bu Kez Anladım" (I Understood It This Time) and "Dayan Yalnızlığım" (Endure, My Loneliness).

Emre's album quickly became a smash hit in Turkey, having won several awards, including Blue Jean Magazine's awards for Best Song, Best Newcomer, Best Music Video and his producer, Haluk Kurosman was named Best Producer.
Emre also won the prestigious Powertürk Music Award as Best Newcomer in 2007 and a year later was awarded for the Best song and Best duet at the same gala (see Awards section for a full list of awards). The album received mostly positive criticism, according to Burhan Ayeri columnist, "Emre Aydın's performance at 2 Renk [a television programme] was extraordinary. With a good manager, he will sweep away Tarkan. As Özcan Deniz said, 'this is the first time we see all songs of an album being top hits'."

The singer is among the most frequently touring Turkish singers, in 2007 he gave 130 live concerts until August. Emre also completed his first European tour in 2008, composed of concerts in Bochum, Cologne and Rotterdam and performed in the Carling Academy, London on 11 May 2008.

On 6 November 2008 he won the MTV Europe Music Awards 2008 as Europe's Favourite Act. Upon this success, the singer decided to release an English single, planned for March 2009, which will be followed by his second Turkish album, ought to be released in May 2009.

The singer's popularity is effectively shown at his official forum, which had 79,000 registered members as of October 2007 and more than 150,000 as of October 2009.

Discography

Albums

With 6. Cadde

Solo albums

Guest appearances

Singles

Chart positions

Awards
Emre Aydin's awards listed in timely order, international awards in bold:
 10. Istanbul FM Gold Awards: Best Newcomer (En iyi çıkış)
 Blue Jean Magazin Best of 2006 Awards:
 Best Song
 Best Video (for Afili Yalızlık)
 Best Newcomer
 Best Producer (Haluk Kurosman)
 Dream Magazine Best of 2006 Awards:
 Best Turkish Male Singer
 Best Turkish New Singer
 Best Turkish Album
 Best Turkish Song
 Best Turkish Video (for Afili Yalnızlık)
 Powertürk Music Awards
 Best Newcomer (En İyi Çıkış Yapan Sanatçı)
 34. Hürriyet Altın Kelebek Ödülleri (34th Golden Butterfly Awards)
 Best Newcomer (En iyi çıkış yapan solist)
 14. Altın Objektif Ödülleri 2006 (14. Golden Objective Awards 2006)
 Yılın En İyi Çıkış Yapan Yorumcusu (The Best Newcoming Singer of the Year)
 11. Istanbul FM Gold Awards 2007
Best rock male singer
 Best song with best lyrics & music (together with Gripin for the song Sensiz İstanbul'a Düşmanım)
 Dream Magazine 2007 Awards
 En İyi Erkek Sanatçı (Best male singer)
 Yılın Yerli Şarkısı (Domestic Song of the Year): Git
 Yılın Yerli Müzik Olayı (Domestic Music Event of the Year): Gripin-emreaydın: Sensiz İstanbul'a Düşmanım duet
 Dream TV 2007 Top 50 Songs
 3rd place: Gripin-emreaydın: Sensiz İstanbul'a Düşmanım (first among Turkish songs)
 38th place: Kim Dokunduysa Sana
 Powertürk Music Awards 2008
 Best song: Gripin& emreaydın: Sensiz İstanbul'a Düşmanım
 Best duet: Gripin& emreaydın: Sensiz İstanbul'a Düşmanım
 14. Kral TV Video Müzik Ödülleri
 Best Rock Singer
35. Altın Kelebek TV Yıldızları Ödülleri
 Best Video: Belki Bir Gün Özlersin
MTV Türkiye 2008
 Best Turkish Act
MTV Europe Music Awards 2008
 Best European Act
 Blue Jean Magazine: The Best of 2008
 Best male singer
 Türkiye Müzik Ödülleri  : Turkish Music Awards
 2012 Year's Best Duet: Soğuk Odalar (Turkish Music Awards/ Türkiye Müzik Ödülleri)
 2012 Year's Best Single: Beni Biraz Böyle Hatırla (Turkish Music Awards/ Türkiye Müzik Ödülleri)

References

External links

 Official website 
 Emre Aydın at ShowCaseYourMusic.com
 Emre Aydın at MTV Türkiye 
 Emre Aydın International 

1981 births
Living people
People from Isparta
Turkish singer-songwriters
Turkish rock musicians
Turkish rock singers
21st-century Turkish singers
MTV Europe Music Award winners